The 1923 Utah Utes football team was an American football team that represented the University of Utah as a member of the Rocky Mountain Conference (RMC) during the 1923 college football season. In their fifth season under head coach Thomas M. Fitzpatrick, the Utes compiled an overall of record of 4–3 with a mark of 2–3 in conference play, finished fifth in the RMC, and outscored opponents by a total of 241 to 48.

Schedule

References

Utah
Utah Utes football seasons
Utah Utes football